Sarah Kaufman (born 1985) is a bantamweight mixed martial artist.

Sarah Kaufman may also refer to: 

 Sarah Kaufman (critic) (born 1963), author and dance critic
 Sarah Kaufman, Vocativ reporter and winner of a 2015 Front Page Award
 Sarah Kaufman, soccer midfielder for the Fort Wayne Fever in 2009